Ian Geoffrey Levine (born 22 June 1953) is a British songwriter, producer, and DJ. A moderniser of Northern soul music in the UK, and a developer of the style of hi-NRG, he has written and produced records with sales totalling over 40 million. Levine was once known as a fan of the long-running television show Doctor Who.

Early and personal life
Levine was born into a Jewish family; his parents owned and ran the "Lemon Tree" complex in Blackpool, including its casino and nightclub. Levine is openly gay. He suffered a major stroke in July 2014, leaving him with severely limited movement on the left side of his body.

Career

Disc jockey
Levine began collecting Motown records from the age of 13, building a collection from UK record shops and those his family visited on holidays to Miami and New Orleans. He later became an avid collector of soul, R&B, and Northern soul. After his parents emigrated to the Caribbean in 1979, Levine sold most of his records to fund a house purchase in London.

Having attended some early Northern soul all-nighters at "The Twisted Wheel" nightclub in Manchester with DJ Stuart Bremner, on leaving school in 1971 he became a disc jockey at the Blackpool Mecca. Levine joined other DJs in travelling to Stoke on Trent to join the Northern soul all-nighter "Torch", which was quickly shut down but was the fore runner of the Wigan Casino events, which Levine opened. Working with fellow DJ Colin Curtis, the pair was responsible for guiding the Northern Soul scene away from its oldies-only policy and towards modern soul and disco. This resulted in BBC Radio 1's DJ John Peel travelling to Blackpool to interview Levine.

In 1979, Levine began advising London's gay disco Heaven on its set-up, and became the club's first resident DJ, remaining through most of the 1980s. Levine was also one of the first DJs to mix records in the UK.

Writer/producer
In 1974, Levine assisted Dave McAleer with in compiling Solid Soul Sensations, which was released on the British Disco Demand label and reached No. 30 on the UK Albums Chart. With the proceeds, he travelled to New York City and co-produced Reaching for the Best with girl group the Exciters, which reached No. 31 on the UK Singles Chart selling 80,000 records. This allowed Levine to then travel to Chicago, where he signed postman L.J. Johnson, Barbara Pennington (who both after appearing on Top of the Pops reached the UK Singles Chart), as well as Evelyn Thomas. Although Thomas's 1976 record "Weak Spot" was not a big success reaching No. 26 in the UK, Levine later co-produced Thomas's 1984 hit record "High Energy".

Hi-NRG and pop

In 1983, the London-based record shop Record Shack offered Levine £2,000 to set up a new joint-venture record label, Record Shack Records. Through friend Jean-Philippe Iliesco, he used his Trident Studios, and formed a songwriting partnership with Fiachra Trench.

The first record from the label was "So Many Men, So Little Time" by Miquel Brown, which sold two million copies and got to number 2 on the American Dance Club Songs chart. This was quickly followed by "High Energy" by Evelyn Thomas. The partnership with Record Shack ended in 1985.

After his return to the UK following the financial failure of Motorcity Records, Levine wrote and produced hi-NRG-derived singles for various bands, including Take That (he co-produced three tracks on their debut album and co-wrote one), and the Pasadenas. During the 1980s and 1990s, he co-wrote and/or mixed a number of dance-pop hits for a variety of artists, including Pet Shop Boys, Bucks Fizz, Erasure, Kim Wilde, Bronski Beat, Amanda Lear, Bananarama, Tiffany, Dollar, and Hazell Dean. He has also written and produced several TV themes including "Discomania", "Gypsy Girl", "ITV Celebrity Awards Show", "Christmasmania" and "Abbamania".

Manager
Levine founded bands, including Seventh Avenue, which featured two members of Big Fun; Optimystic; and Bad Boys Inc. In 2010, Levine formed a new boy band called Inju5tice. After the commercial failure of debut "A Long Long Way from Home", the group and Levine split, and the group relaunched itself as ELi'Prime.

Record labels

In 1987, Levine began recording some former artists from Motown. After a reunion of 60 Motown stars, including Edwin Starr and Levi Stubbs on top of a hotel opposite the original Hitsville USA building, Motorcity Records was launched as a record label. Initially distributed by PRT, then Pacific, Charly and finally Total/BMG, by the time that the label ended in the 1990s due to severe financial losses, 850 songs had been recorded by 108 artists.

Doctor Who
Levine is well known as a fan of the BBC science fiction television series Doctor Who. Levine was, in part, responsible for the return of a number of missing episodes of the show to the BBC's archives. He also retained many off-air recordings. Levine was consulted by members of the production team about continuity for a while during the mid-1980s.

In 1985, when the BBC announced that the series would be placed on an eighteen-month hiatus, and the show's cancellation was widely rumoured, Levine was heavily involved with the media protest covertly organised by series producer John Nathan-Turner. He appeared on the ITN's News at One arguing against the decision, and together with the series' production manager Gary Downie gathered a group of actors from the series to record "Doctor in Distress". The single was universally panned.

Levine also organised a private project to recreate the incomplete 1979 Doctor Who story Shada with animation and newly recorded dialogue from many surviving cast members. Levine had hoped that the project would be released on DVD, but the commissioning editor of the Doctor Who DVD range did not use Levine's animation on the DVD release of the story. The completed Levine version appeared on torrent sites almost two years later, on 12 October 2013.

Levine has been responsible for producing a number of extras on the Doctor Who DVD releases: the documentaries Over the Edge and Inside the Spaceship were included on the 3-disc set The Beginning, while Genesis of a Classic appeared on the release for Genesis of the Daleks. He also co-wrote the theme music for K-9 and Company, a pilot for a proposed Doctor Who spin-off series featuring the robotic dog and Sarah Jane Smith.

In October 2017, Levine claimed he had quit Doctor Who fandom in response to harsh criticism from other Who fans.

American comic books
Levine claimed to have the only complete set of DC Comics in the world, with at least one copy of each DC comic book sold at retail from the 1930s to 2004. He later sold the collection.

Genealogy
Levine started working on his family tree after his grandmother Golda Cooklin died on February 18, 1995. In July 1996, they organised a Cooklin Reunion in London for 400 people, covered on the BBC Evening News. They discoved that Cooklin was an anglicised version of Kuklya, from Latvia. In July 2017, they organised a huge Kuklya Reunion in Watford for 500 people from all over the world which was covered in a five-minute piece on the BBC One's The One Show and a two-page centre spread of the Sunday Mirror. In October 2018, a group of 100 family members gathered in Rezekne in Latvia to lay a memorial stone to the family, many of whom were killed in the Holocaust. In September 2019, there was another reunion in Haifa in Israel, for 150 family members. In 2016, Levine made a four disc, eighteen hour documentary on DVD called The Cooklins Anthology, distributing one thousand copies for the entire family. In February 2017, Levine wrote and created a 608-page book, The Kukla Chronicles, again distributing one thousand copies for the entire family. Levine is distantly related to Bob Dylan, the Chief Rabbi of the United Hebrew Congregations of the Commonwealth Ephraim Mirvis, the celebrated writer Saul Bellow and the film director Harold Ramis.

References

Sources

External links
Ian Levine's YouTube Channel
Ian Levine's Top 40 Northern soul Playlist "Reaching For The Best"

Interview by Bill Brewster

1953 births
Living people
People from Blackpool
British Jews
People educated at Arnold School
English DJs
Club DJs
Doctor Who fandom
English record producers
English songwriters
English film directors
English film producers
LGBT DJs
English LGBT musicians
British hi-NRG musicians
LGBT Jews
Electronic dance music DJs